This is a list of winners and nominees for the BAFTA Award for Best Editing, which is presented to film editors, given out by the British Academy of Film and Television Arts since 1968.

The film-voting members of the Academy select the five nominated films in each category; only the principal editor(s) for each film are named, which excludes additional editors, supervising editors, etc. The actual winner of Best Editing is selected by "Chapter Voting"; only Academy members who are identified as members of the Editing Chapter vote on the winner.

Winners and nominees

1960s

1970s

1980s

1990s

2000s

2010s

2020s

Notes

See also
 AACTA Award for Best Editing
 Academy Award for Best Film Editing
 Independent Spirit Award for Best Editing
 Critics' Choice Movie Award for Best Editing
 American Cinema Editors Award for Best Edited Feature Film – Dramatic
 American Cinema Editors Award for Best Edited Feature Film – Comedy or Musical

References

External links
 

British Academy Film Awards
 
Film editing awards